James Owens Farm is a historic home and farm at Bristol, Anne Arundel County, Maryland.  The home was built by successful tobacco farmer James Owens and is a large mid-19th century, two-story brick cross-gable late Greek Revival/Italianate dwelling. Outbuildings are all of frame construction and include an early 19th-century cornhouse, an early 19th-century tobacco barn, a mid-19th-century board-and-batten kitchen, carriage house, and smokehouse, and a late 19th-century chicken house.

It was listed on the National Register of Historic Places in 1987.

References

External links
, including photo from 1986, at Maryland Historical Trust

Houses on the National Register of Historic Places in Maryland
Houses in Anne Arundel County, Maryland
Houses completed in the 19th century
Greek Revival houses in Maryland
Italianate architecture in Maryland
National Register of Historic Places in Anne Arundel County, Maryland